Cooleman Court, sometimes known colloquially as "Coolo", is a sub-regional shopping centre located in the Weston Creek suburb of Weston, Australia. Cooleman Court offers a total of 80 stores and facilities, spanning indoor and outdoor space, replicating something of a town square. Its major tenant is Woolworths. Other retailers in the centre include Aldi, The Reject Shop, Best & Less, Bakers Delight and BWS.

History
Cooleman Court was opened in 1988 as a neighbourhood shopping centre, designed to contrast and compete with the already-existing Woden Plaza (now Westfield Woden). Its only major tenant was Woolworths, and was designed to serve the western suburbs of Woden and the far-northern suburbs of Tuggeranong.

During the late 1990s, development began to expand the Centre outwards, including buildings to house the Weston Raiders Club, a Caltex service station (now Ampol), and what is now known as the Weston Arcade. It would introduce the Target discount department store, among many other retailers, making the Centre form to serve entire regions rather than a set of suburbs.

In early 2019, a Master Plan was announced by Mirvac to expand the Centre to the north, and create an additional space to house the Fresh Food and Dining districts, and easier access to the carpark. This new section was opened in early 2020.

As part of nationwide restructuring, the Target store closed in mid 2021.

References

External links 

 Official website

 

Shopping centres in the Australian Capital Territory
Buildings and structures in Canberra
Shopping malls established in 1988
1988 establishments in Australia